James R. McCartney (April 7, 1920 in Meyersdale, Pennsylvania, USA – February 22, 2011 in Morgantown, West Virginia, USA) was the Secretary of State of West Virginia from 1975 until 1977. He was a highly decorated World War II United States Army veteran, receiving two Silver Stars, the Purple Heart, Presidential Unit Citation, French Croix de Guerre, and Belgian Fougerre.  McCartney graduated from West Virginia University and served on several state commissions including the West Virginia Ethics Commission.

Notes

West Virginia University alumni
Secretaries of State of West Virginia
1920 births
2011 deaths
People from Somerset County, Pennsylvania
Military personnel from Pennsylvania
United States Army personnel of World War II